YIO may refer to:

 Pond Inlet Airport (IATA code: YIO), Nunavut, Canada
 Yamashina Institute for Ornithology, Tokyo, Japan